Life Showcase TV was a British television channel owned and operated by Life TV Media, the second television channel from the company after Life TV. With Life 24, the company merged its channels into Life One on 20 August 2007. The Channel Four Television Corporation brought its three Sky Digital EPG slots and moved its own channels there.

Satellite television
Television channels in the United Kingdom
Defunct television channels in the United Kingdom
Television channels and stations established in 2002
Television channels and stations disestablished in 2007
2002 establishments in the United Kingdom